Włostowice may refer to the following places:
Włostowice, Lesser Poland Voivodeship (south Poland)
Włostowice, Łódź Voivodeship (central Poland)
Włostowice, Lubusz Voivodeship (west Poland)
Włostowice, Puławy, a district of the town of Puławy in Lublin Voivodeship (east Poland)